Murrah ibn Ka'b ibn Luay ibn Ghalib ibn Fihr ibn Malik was a man from Quraysh tribe, supposed to have lived in the 4th century. He was the sixth-in-line of Muhammad's grandfathers. He is the common ancestor of all four of Muhammad's grandparents. He is also the common ancestor of six of Muhammad's eight great-grandparents. He is also the common ancestor of Muhammad and his friend Abu Bakr.

Descendants

Abdul Muttalib (Muhammad's paternal grandfather):	
Father:Hashim ibn Abd Manaf ibn Qusay ibn Kilab ibn Murrah ibn Ka'b.
Mother:Salma bint Amr An-Najjariya (not a descendant of Murrah).
Fatimah bint Amr (Muhammad's paternal grandmother):
Father:Amr ibn Ae’z ibn Imran ibn Makhzum ibn Yaqza ibn Murrah ibn Ka'b.
Mother:Sakhra bint Abd ibn Imran ibn Makhzum ibn Yaqza ibn Murrah ibn Ka'b.
Wahb ibn 'Abd Manaf (Muhammad's maternal grandfather):
Father:Abd Manaf ibn Zuhra ibn Kilab ibn Murrah ibn Ka'b.
Mother:Atika bint a-Awqas As-Sulamiya (not a descendant of Murrah).
Barrah bint Abdul Uzza (Muhammad's maternal grandmother):
Father:Abdul Uzza ibn Othman ibn Abd Addar ibn Qusay ibn Kilab ibn Murrah ibn Ka'b.
Mother:Um Habib bint Assad ibn Abdul Uzza ibn Qusay ibn Kilab ibn Murrah ibn Ka'b.

His mother was Wahshiya bint Shaiban ibn Muharib ibn Fihr ibn Malik, so his mother was a second cousin of his father.

References

Sources
Ibn Hisham's Prophet Muhammad's biography (Arabic)

Ancestors of Muhammad
4th-century Arabs
Quraysh